The Barrie Flyers were a Canadian men's senior ice hockey team from Barrie, Ontario. They were members of the Ontario Hockey Association (OHA) and played in the OHA Senior A Hockey League from 1966 to 1979, then in the Major Intermediate A Hockey League from 1979 to 1983. The name Barrie Flyers was previously used by a junior ice hockey team from 1945 to 1960.

History
The Barrie Flyers won the J. Ross Robertson Cup as OHA Senior A League champions in 1972, 1974, 1975 and 1976.

The Flyers won the 1974 Allan Cup as Canadian Senior A champions, beating the Cranbrook Royals 4-2 in the playdown final, and were national finalists in 1972, 1975 and 1976. They moved to the Major Intermediate A Hockey League in 1979 and played there until the league folded in 1983. Barrie returned to Senior A in 1983 as the "Broncos."

1972 Allan Cup
Barrie won its first OHA Senior A championship and travelled to Spokane, Washington to face the Spokane Jets in the Allan Cup final playdown series. Spokane won the best-of-seven series 4-2.

Game 1 - Barrie 0 at Spokane 3
Game 2 - Barrie 3 at Spokane 8
Game 3 - Barrie 4 at Spokane 2
Game 4 - Barrie 4 at Spokane 1
Game 5 - Barrie 3 at Spokane 7
Game 6 - Barrie 3 at Spokane 6

1974 Allan Cup
Barrie recaptured the OHA Senior A championship and advanced to meet the Cranbrook Royals in the Allan Cup final playdown series. All games were played in Cranbrook, British Columbia. Barrie defeated the Royals 4-2 in the best-of-seven series.

Game 1 - Barrie 4 vs Cranbrook 1
Game 2 - Barrie 2 vs Cranbrook 4
Game 3 - Barrie 5 vs Cranbrook 9
Game 4 - Barrie 5 vs Cranbrook 4 (double OT)
Game 5 - Barrie 4 vs Cranbrook 3
Game 6 - Barrie 4 vs Cranbrook 1

1975 Allan Cup
Barrie won its third OHA Senior A title in four years and met the Thunder Bay Twins in the Allan Cup final. The first three games in the best-of-seven series were played in Barrie and the remaining games were staged in Thunder Bay, Ontario. The Twins won the series 4-2.

Game 1 - Barrie 8 vs Thunder Bay 5
Game 2 - Barrie 2 vs Thunder Bay 7
Game 3 - Barrie 7 vs Thunder Bay 4
Game 4 - Barrie 2 at Thunder Bay 8
Game 5 - Barrie 2 at Thunder Bay 5
Game 6 - Barrie 4 at Thunder Bay 8

1976 Allan Cup
Barrie made its fourth and final trip to the Allan Cup final after winning its third straight OHA Senior A championship and fourth in five years. Once again the Flyers travelled to Spokane, where their opponents were now also known as the Flyers. Spokane swept Barrie 4-0 in the best-of-seven series.

Game 1 - Barrie 4 at Spokane 9
Game 2 - Barrie 1 at Spokane 4
Game 3 - Barrie 4 at Spokane 7
Game 4 - Barrie 2 at Spokane 8

Season-by-Season results

Notable alumni
Bob Dupuis
Bob Perani
Darryl Sly

References

Sport in Barrie
Defunct ice hockey teams in Canada
Ice hockey teams in Ontario
Senior ice hockey teams
1966 establishments in Ontario
1984 disestablishments in Ontario
Ice hockey clubs established in 1966
Sports clubs disestablished in 1984